Broken Machine is the second studio album by British rock band Nothing but Thieves. It was released on 8 September 2017 under RCA and Sony Music and produced by Mike Crossey.

Critical reception

Upon release, Nothing But Thieves received generally positive reviews from critics, with several comments on the development of the band's style. Roisin Oconnor of The Independent described the album as being among 'the best rock albums of the year'. She wrote that it 'showcases the band's consciousness' both on their own development and on the global events taking place around the world.

Varsity's Sarah Taylor awarded the album 4 out of 5 stars, writing that there had been notable anticipation leading up to the album's release and that it '[did] not disappoint'. Taylor also praised the album for 'pushing more boundaries than the last', highlighting the variety in their music and lyricism as an example of them further defining their style.

Linda Köke of Genre Is Dead gave similar praise, writing that the band had showcased their ability to 'follow in the footsteps of rock giants' with their latest album. Köke praises the album's energy while Taylor praises the album's experimental nature, though Köke provides a slightly contrary opinion, describing the tenth track "Hell, Yeah" as being an 'almost mandatory late-album ballad'. Köke does however go on to award the album 4.5 out of 5 stars.

Luke Nuttall of The Soundboard builds on the more critical thoughts of Köke by describing the album as having only 'fragments' of the strongest elements from its predecessor, with most of the 'heavy lifting' being done by the vocals of Conor Mason. Nuttall echoes criticism of final tracks "Hell, Yeah" and "Afterlife", going as far as to argue that the tracks are only 'tolerable' because of the band's capabilities. Nuttall also criticised the production quality on the album, describing it as seeming more 'lax' compared to their debut. He provides a contrasting opinion to that of Taylor and Köke, stating that the band's attempt to experiment with their sound as 'falling flat'. In closing however, Nuttall does describe the album as having 'some nice ideas that are definitely eligible to carry on into the future'.

Track listing

Credits adapted from the Deluxe album notes.

Personnel

Credits adapted from Deluxe album's liner notes.

Nothing but Thieves 

 Conor Mason - vocals
 Joe Langridge-Brown - guitar, percussion
 Dominic Craik - guitar, percussion, as well as piano on "Particles (Piano version)"
 Phil Blake - bass
 James Price - drums

Additional personnel 

 Mike Crossey - production, mixing, programming
 Dominic Craik - programming, mixing on "Sorry (Acoustic)" and "Particles (Piano version)"
 Jonathan Gilmore - engineering, programming
 Joseph Rodgers - engineering on "Sorry (Acoustic)" and "Particles (Piano version)"
 Robin Schmidt - mastering (24-96 Mastering)

Charts and certifications

Certifications

Release history

See also
 Kintsugi

References

2017 albums
Nothing but Thieves albums
Albums produced by Mike Crossey